Sauer 101 is a bolt action rifle manufactured by Sauer & Sohn that was launched in 2013. The rifle is manufactured on the same factory and shares many parts with the Mauser M12.

Technical 
The stock comes with a proprietary bedding system called "Ever-Rest" which consists of a metal block around the front action screw. The rifle was launched in two variants; "Classic" with a walnut stock and "Classic XT" with a black synthetic stock. Several other variants have since been introduced, including:

 Artemis
 Classic
 Classic XTA
 Classic XT
 Forest
 Forest XT
 GTI
 Highland XTX
 Select

The receiver has an outside profile similar to the Remington 700 which allows for the use of standard Remington 700 scope pattern scope mount.

The bolt has 6 locking lugs and a 60 degree bolt throw, and locks directly into the barrel instead of into the receiver. The barrel is mounted to the receiver without action threads with a press fit and heat.

See also 
 Sauer 90
 Sauer 100
 Sauer 200
 Sauer 202
 Sauer 303
 Sauer 404

References

External links 
 Sauer 101 Classic XT at J. P. Sauer & Sohn

Rifles of Germany